South Dakota Magazine is a bi-monthly magazine publication that explores the culture, events, history, characters, landscape and communities of South Dakota. Bernie Hunhoff founded the magazine in 1985 after several years in the newspaper business,. His daughter, Katie Hunhoff, is now the editor and publisher. The magazine has also produced several books featuring South Dakota stories, photography, and interesting places.

The magazine headquarters are located at  410 E 3rd St in Yankton, South Dakota, in a historic brick building built in the 1870s by Dakota Territorial Governor John L. Pennington.

Bernie Hunhoff and South Dakota Magazine have been recognized with numerous awards for their efforts in promoting South Dakota, including the 2011 A.H. Pankow Award and the South Dakota Humanities Council's award for Distinguished Achievement in the Humanities.

Further reading
In 1988, Bernie Hunhoff published Uniquely South Dakota with Robert Karolevitz, a prolific Yankton, South Dakota author and journalist. The coffee table book features many photographs.

References

External links
 

Bimonthly magazines published in the United States
Cultural magazines published in the United States
Local interest magazines published in the United States
Magazines established in 1985
Magazines published in South Dakota
Works about South Dakota
1985 establishments in South Dakota